Suparatana Bencharongkul is a Thai agriculturist, lifestyle influencer, and the daughter of Boonchai Bencharongkul, billionaire telecommunication tycoon. As an agriculturist, she combined farming and technology to start the Farmer Info Application, Sabuymarket, Allbio, Farmmanyam, Rakbankerd Products and Fulfield initiatives for the benefit of the farmers in Thailand.

She received a Bachelor of Business Administration from the University of Kent in 2003 and an Executive Master of Business Administration from the Sasin School of Management of Chulalongkorn University in 2015.

Career
Suparatana is the chief operating officer of Rakbankerd Group, which is part of the family-owned Benchachinda Group. Her efforts are centered towards improving agricultural production in Thailand through smart technology of artificial intelligence, unmanned aviation systems and sensors, leading to higher yields per acre.

Suparatana pioneered the use of smart technology in agriculture, particularly rice production, which is one of Thailand's main crops. The technology aims to get more production for farmers in Thailand.

See also
Agricultural technology
Thailand rice production

References

External links
Rakbankered Company Limited

Year of birth missing (living people)
Suparatana Bencharongkul
Living people
Women innovators
Suparatana Bencharongkul
Alumni of the University of Kent